The Kawasaki Versys is a family of adventure touring motorcycles manufactured by Kawasaki since 2007.
Versys-X 250/300, 2017–present, based on the twin-cylinder Ninja 250R/300.
Versys 650, 2007–present, based on the twin-cylinder Ninja 650R.
Versys 1000, 2012–present, based on the four-cylinder Z1000.

Versys
Standard motorcycles